Future's Past is the 13th studio album by Traffic founder guitarist/vocalist Dave Mason. The album debuted at #7 on the Billboard Blues Album Charts. The album has a review of 3 out of 5 on AllMusic.

Track listing

Personnel

Musicians
 Dave Mason - guitar, bass guitar, vocals
 John McEuen - guitar, backing vocals
 John Sambataro - guitar, backing vocals
 Jason Roller - guitar, backing vocals
 Joe Bonamassa - guitar
 Alex Drizos - bass guitar
 George Hawkins - bass guitar
 Gerald Johnson - bass guitar
 Bill Reynolds - bass guitar
 Carmine Rojas - bass guitar
 Renato Neto - bass guitar, keyboards, organ
 Tony Patler - bass guitar, keyboards, organ, backing vocals
 Bill Mason - keyboards, organ
 Dave Palmer - keyboards, organ	
 Mike Finnigan - keyboards, organ, backing vocals	
 Alvino Bennett - drums	
 Tal Bergman - drums
 Ken Eros - drums
 T.J. Russell - drums, backing vocals
 Bob Corritore - harmonica	
 Warren Hill - saxophone	
 Suzanne Paris - backing vocals

Production
Produced by Dave Mason
Engineered and mixed by T.J. Russell, Matt Linesch, and Ken Eros
Mastered by Reuben Cohen

Charts
The album peaked at No. 7 on the Billboard Top Blues Albums chart.

References

External links

2014 albums
Dave Mason albums
Albums produced by Dave Mason